Archer City Independent School District is a public school district based in Archer City, Texas (USA).   Archer City serves much of Archer County, including the city of Archer City and most of the city of Scotland.

Finances
As of the 2010–2011 school year, the appraised valuation of property in the district was $174,509,000. The maintenance tax rate was $0.102 and the bond tax rate was $0.008 per $100 of appraised valuation.

Academic achievement
In 2011, the school district was rated "recognized" by the Texas Education Agency.  Thirty-five percent of districts in Texas in 2011 received the same rating. No state accountability ratings will be given to districts in 2012. A school district in Texas can receive one of four possible rankings from the Texas Education Agency: Exemplary (the highest possible ranking), Recognized, Academically Acceptable, and Academically Unacceptable (the lowest possible ranking).

Historical district TEA accountability ratings
2011: Recognized
2010: Recognized
2009: Recognized
2008: Recognized
2007: Recognized
2006: Recognized
2005: Recognized
2004: Recognized

Schools
In the 2012–2013 school year, the district had students in two schools. 
Archer City High School (grades 7-12)
Archer City Elementary School (grades EE-6)

Special programs

Athletics
Archer City High School participates in the boys sports of baseball, basketball, and football. The school participates in the girls sports of basketball, softball, and volleyball. For the 2012 through 2014 school years, Archer City High School will play football in UIL Class 2A Division II.

See also

List of school districts in Texas
List of high schools in Texas

References

External links
Archer City ISD

School districts in Archer County, Texas